The European cucumber (also known as English cucumber) is a variety of "seedless" cucumber that is longer and slimmer than other varieties of cucumber. 
 
They do not have a layer of wax on them, and the skin is tender when ripe.

These cucumbers may come wrapped in plastic for longer shelf-life and better freshness. As a seedless variety, they do not have to be seeded or peeled before consuming.

They can be more expensive and less flavorful than some other types of cucumber. They are used in salads, and for pickling. They can be sliced lengthwise, width-wise, diced and julienned. They  then  can be grilled and puréed.

References 

Cucumber
European cuisine